John Johnsen (17 March 1895 – 2 February 1969) was a Norwegian football player for the club SK Brann. He was born in Bergen. He played with the Norwegian national team at the Antwerp Olympics in 1920, where the Norwegian team reached the quarter-finals. He was capped nine times for Norway. He died in Bergen in 1969.

References

External links

1895 births
1969 deaths
Footballers from Bergen
Norwegian footballers
Norway international footballers
Footballers at the 1920 Summer Olympics
Olympic footballers of Norway
Association football defenders
SK Brann players